Dyschirius pauxillus is a species of ground beetle in the subfamily Scaritinae. It was described by Thomas Vernon Wollaston in 1864.

References

pauxillus
Beetles described in 1864